Augustus John Turner, (October 12, 1818 – May 14, 1905), known as "A. J. Turner", was an American composer, band leader and music professor. He was the first director of the Stonewall Brigade Band of Staunton, Virginia, the oldest continuous community band funded by tax moneys in the United States. They were mustered into the Stonewall Brigade under Stonewall Jackson of the Confederacy during the Civil War. Turner was a professor of music at both the Wesleyan Female Institute and the Deaf, Dumb, and Blind Institute, and he played a part in the temperance movement.

Ancestry and early years
Augustus John Turner was born on October 12, 1818, in Spartanburg County, South Carolina, to Samuel M. Turner and Mahala Johnson Chapman. His father Samuel was a farmer living near the site of Fort Prince.

Both Turner's grandfathers fought in the Revolutionary War. His father Samuel's father was James Turner, who settled in South Carolina near Coulter's Ford on the Pacolet River with his father George Henry Turner, after the death of his mother Hannah Middleton in Virginia. James Turner prepared beef for the patriots the night before the Battle of Cowpens. He married Margaret Headen. Horseshoe Robinson married Sarah Headen, making James Turner and Robinson brothers-in-law.

Turner's mother's father was Jack Chapman, a Revolutionary war captain in Virginia. Jack Chapman married the sister of Jammie Seay. Both Samuel Turner and Jack Chapman were active at Mount Zion Baptist Church, whose pastor was John Gill Landrum. On his death, A. J. Turner wrote this acrostic:

Lo! a Prince in Zion has been taken away.

And mourners thread the streets day after day.

No face is seen that does not deepest sorrow show;

Departed are our joys and only bitter woe

Remains, since thou, oh! Counselor and friend,

Unto thy grave are gone can no longer lend

Mankind thy sage advise - God pity on us send.

Frederick County
Before moving to Staunton, Turner lived in Middletown and Newtown (now Stephen's' City), near Winchester in Frederick County, Virginia. He married Catherine ("Kate") Montrose Aby on July 1, 1845, in Frederick County. The ceremony was performed by John Allemong. Kate Aby's father was a shoemaker and veteran of the War of 1812. Her mother, who lived at Thorndale Farm, was the daughter of a drummer in the American Revolution.

In 1846, a son was born in Newtown, Charles W. Turner. Turner also spent time at Greenville, where he played with the famous banjoist Joel Sweeney in 1847, and organized a band in Middlebrook. In 1847 a second son was born in Middletown, T. M. Turner.

Turner's house in Newtown was destroyed in a fire on December 2, 1856.

Staunton

Stonewall Brigade Band
In Staunton, Virginia, in 1855, David W. Drake sought help in founding a band. He enlisted the help of Turner, his former music teacher in Newtown, persuading him to move to Staunton. Together with two other citizens of Staunton, they formed the Mountain Saxhorn Band. Turner was the band's first director,  and it is still active today, the oldest continuous community band funded by tax moneys in the United States.

They gave their first formal concert on July 17, 1857, at Union Hall on Beverley Street in Staunton. By 1859 the band had come to be known as Turner's Silver Cornet Band. At Armory Hall on April 4, 1861, Turner's Silver Cornet Band, together with the Staunton Musical Association and the Glee Club, presented the last concert to be given before the Civil War. Turner played the soprano cornet.

Civil War

The band was mustered into the 5th Virginia Infantry Regiment under Stonewall Jackson and Colonel William S. Baylor, and left Staunton on April 17, 1861. Soon after the Battle of First Manassas, the band earned the name Stonewall Brigade Band, and has been known as such ever since. As well as playing their instruments, band members fought and acted as couriers and letter bearers or medical assistants. In addition to entertaining the troops in the field, the band frequently appeared in concerts in Fredericksburg, Richmond, Staunton, and elsewhere to support recruiting rallies, clothing drives, and war relief fundraising.

An account of the Battle of Hoke's Run in the Staunton Spectator reads: "Little Charley Turner, a boy about 15 years of age, insisted so strongly on going with the Augusta Guards that his father finally yielded to his importunities and allowed him to go. The result shows that little Charley went to perform service, for he made one of the enemy bite the dust." Though not in the band, Turner's first son Charles was an orderly and courier for Stonewall Jackson.

A. J. Turner and his son T. M. Turner enlisted for the Confederacy on April 1, 1862. They were in the Churchville Cavalry Troop, 14th Virginia Infantry Company I for a time, commanded by James A. Cochran, before transferring into the 5th. They served through the Valley Campaign, the Seven Days Battles around Richmond, and were at the Battle of Cedar Mountain.  They were discharged because of age (A. J. too old and T. M. too young) on August 22, 1862.

Post-war
The band was reorganized in 1869 with Turner as leader and his son T. M. Turner as assistant leader. A. J. Turner directed the band until 1884. In 1881, he organized Fravel's Cornet Band in Woodstock.

Music teacher
Turner could play many instruments. An 1860 advert for his services reads, "Teaches Piano, Guitar, Flute, Violin, &c, &c; also Ballad Singing". An 1896 ad reads, "Prof. A. J. Turner respectfully solicits a class of young people of both sexes in music ... Instruments: violin, piano, guitar, mandolin, cello and cornet." He was also an agent for the sale of Stieff pianos. He lived at 15 Fayette St.

Wesleyan Female Institute
Turner's first job in Staunton was teaching vocal and instrumental music at the Wesleyan Female Institute, next to the Methodist Church, and across from Trinity Episcopal Church.

Deaf, Dumb, and Blind Institute

Turner was appointed professor of music at the Deaf, Dumb, and Blind Institute in November 1866 and served there for several years, teaching the blind pupils. He "evolved many of the methods now in vogue for giving blind children a musical education." One account of the institute's annual concert praises the pupils for "a high degree of musical taste and talent". His salary was increased $200 in 1871. He taught there until some time in the 1890s.

Temperance
Turner was active in the temperance movement and in 1878 was elected the Most Worthy Grand Chief of the Sons of Jonadab, for the district covering Virginia and West Virginia.

Indianapolis
Turner left for Indianapolis, Indiana, in 1900 to live with his daughter Cora Turner Freijs. He would reside there until his death in Washington Township. His former house in Staunton sold for $3,350 soon after his death.

List of compositions
"Gallopade", 1857
"At Eve Beneath Stars' Soft Light: or Memories of Old", 1858
"Bessie Bell Waltz", 1858
"Pray Maiden, Pray", 1864, lyrics by A. W. Kercheval. Bobby Horton of Ken Burns fame has a rendition of the song.
"Palmetto Schottisch", 1864
"Spring time polka", 1864
"La Perle", 1875,  melody by J. P. Kavenaugh, arranged for piano by A. J. Turner
"Peyton Summerson's Funeral March", 1879

References

Bibliography

1818 births
1905 deaths
Musicians from South Carolina
People from Spartanburg County, South Carolina
People from Staunton, Virginia
Confederate States Army personnel
Stonewall Brigade
American cornetists
American male composers
American bandleaders
People of Virginia in the American Civil War
19th-century conductors (music)
19th-century American pianists
19th-century American composers
People from Frederick County, Virginia
Musicians from Virginia
American male pianists